Wait-a-while may refer to:

Acacia cuspidifolia, a plant that occurs in Western Australia
Acacia colletioides, a plant that occurs in Western Australia
Smilax australis, a vine that occurs in eastern Australia and the Northern Territory 
Calamus australis, a climbing vine-like palm 
Calamus muelleri, a climbing vine-like palm

See also 
Wait-a-minute tree